The 1984 United States presidential election in Massachusetts took place on November 6, 1984, as part of the 1984 United States presidential election, which was held throughout all 50 states and D.C. Voters chose 13 representatives, or electors to the Electoral College, who voted for president and vice president.

Massachusetts narrowly voted for incumbent Republican President Ronald Reagan of California over his Democratic challenger, former Vice President Walter Mondale of Minnesota. Reagan ran with incumbent Vice President George H. W. Bush of Texas, while Mondale's running mate was Congresswoman Geraldine Ferraro of New York.

On election day, Reagan won 51.22% of the vote in the state to Mondale's 48.43%, a margin of 2.79%.

Massachusetts had been a Democratic-leaning state since 1928, and a Democratic stronghold since 1960. In 1972, Massachusetts was the only state in the nation to vote for Democrat George McGovern over Republican Richard Nixon in the latter's 49-state landslide. However, in 1980, Reagan had won the state for the GOP for the first time since 1956 in a 3-way race with a plurality of only 41.90% and a razor-thin margin of 0.15%. Thus in a 1984 head-to-head match-up, Massachusetts was one of the few states whose outcome remained in doubt as Reagan appeared poised for a convincing win nationwide.

Ultimately, in the midst of a decisive nationwide Republican landslide, Reagan would narrowly triumph in Massachusetts, as he did in 48 other states, leaving Mondale to win only his home state of Minnesota and the District of Columbia. Reagan's win was the first time a Republican had won an absolute majority of the popular vote in Massachusetts since 1956, although it was still Reagan's narrowest win in the nation, thus making it the second most Democratic state after Minnesota. Massachusetts was about 16% more Democratic than the national average in the 1984 election. Mondale's 48.43% of the vote marked his best result of a state he did not carry.

Reagan carried 9 counties in Massachusetts to Mondale's 5. Reagan's strongest county was suburban Plymouth County, where he took 60.2% of the vote. Mondale's strongest county win was Suffolk County, home to the state's capital and largest city, Boston, where he took 62.3% of the vote.

1984 remains the last time to date that a Republican presidential candidate has carried Massachusetts. It is also the last time that Essex County, Norfolk County, Hampden County, Berkshire County, Franklin County, and Nantucket County voted for the Republican candidate. It is also the last time that the cities of Easthampton, Fitchburg, Framingham, Gardner, Gloucester, Greenfield, Haverhill, Lowell, Melrose, Newburyport, Peabody, Quincy, Southbridge, Taunton, Waltham, West Springfield, Weymouth, and Woburn and the towns of Acton, Andover, Ashfield, Ashland, Becket, Brewster, Cheshire, Clarksburg, Colrain, Concord, Dalton, Dartmouth, Eastham, Edgartown, Egremont, Falmouth, Goshen, Great Barrington, Hinsdale, Lanesborough, Lee, Lenox, Leyden, Mashpee, Maynard, Merrimac, Middlefield, Milford, Millis, Nahant, Nantucket, Natick, New Marlborough, Northfield, Norwood, Plainfield, Richmond, Rockport, Sandisfield, Seekonk, South Hadley, Stoneham, Stoughton, Tyringham, Wareham, Washington, Wayland, West Stockbridge, Westport, Whately, and Worthington voted Republican.  This was the first time since 1896 that the town of Blackstone voted for a Republican candidate.

Results

Results by county

Results by Congressional district
Reagan won 8 of 11 Congressional districts, including seven held by Democrats.

Results by municipality

See also
 Presidency of Ronald Reagan
 United States presidential elections in Massachusetts

References

Massachusetts
1984
1984 Massachusetts elections